Philippines competed at the 1988 Summer Paralympics in Seoul, South Korea. 4 competitors from Philippines won no medals and so did not place in the medal table.

Athletics

Daniel Boldo
Mauro Par
Jolly Villota

Swimming

Men

See also 
 Philippines at the Paralympics
 Philippines at the 1988 Summer Olympics

References 

Philippines at the Paralympics
1988 in Philippine sport
Nations at the 1988 Summer Paralympics